Billboard Top Hits: 1975 is a compilation album released by Rhino Records in 1991, featuring 10 hit recordings from 1975.

The track lineup includes seven songs that reached the top of the Billboard Hot 100 chart, including the No. 1 song of 1975, "Love Will Keep Us Together" by Captain & Tennille. The other three songs all reached the top 10 of the Hot 100.

Starting with the 1975 volume, Rhino dubbed each of its mainstream pop top hits volumes Billboard Top Hits. The volumes issued for the years 1955 through 1974 are titled Billboard Top Rock'n'Roll Hits.

Track listing

Track information and credits were taken from the album's liner notes.

References

1991 compilation albums
Billboard Top Hits albums
Rhino Records compilation albums